Fort Hancock High School is a public high school located in Fort Hancock, Texas (USA) and it is classified as a 2A school by the UIL. It is part of the Fort Hancock Independent School District located in southern Hudspeth County.  In 2011, the school was rated "Academically Acceptable" by the Texas Education Agency.

Its district includes the communities of Fort Hancock and Acala.

Athletics
The Fort Hancock Mustangs compete in the following sports:

Baseball
Basketball
6-Man Football
Tennis
Track and Field
Volleyball

State Titles
Football 
1986(6M), 1988(6M), 1989(6M), 1990(6M), 1991(6M)

In the 6 years from 1986 - 1992, Fort Hancock won a total of 5 state championships in Six-Man football including 4 in a row and set a state record for consecutive wins, which was also the second longest in the nation (70 straight wins).

References

External links
Fort Hancock ISD
List of Six-man football stadiums in Texas

Education in Hudspeth County, Texas
Public high schools in Texas